Saprininae is a subfamily of clown beetles in the family Histeridae. There are more than 50 genera and 800 described species in Saprininae.

Genera
These 54 genera belong to the subfamily Saprininae:

 Afroprinus Lackner, 2013
 Afrosaprinus Vienna, 2015
 Alienocacculus Kanaar, 2008
 Ammostyphrus Reichardt, 1924
 Aphelosternus Wenzel in Arnett, 1962
 Axelinus Kryzhanovskij in Kryzhanovskij & Reichardt, 1976
 Chalcionellus Reichardt, 1932
 Chelyoxenus Hubbard, 1894
 Chivaenius Olexa, 1980
 Ctenophilothis Kryzhanovskij, 1987
 Dahlgrenius Penati & Vienna, 1996
 Eopachylopus Reichardt, 1926
 Erebidus Reichardt, 1941
 Eremosaprinus Ross, 1939
 Euspilotus Lewis, 1907
 Exaesiopus Reichardt, 1926
 Geomysaprinus Ross, 1940
 Gnathoncus Jacquelin-Duval, 1858
 Hemisaprinus Kryzhanovskij in Kryzhanovskij & Reichardt, 1976
 Hypocacculus Bickhardt, 1914
 Hypocaccus C. Thomson, 1867
 Malagasyprinus Lackner & Gomy, 2013
 Microsaprinus Kryzhanovskij in Kryzhanovskij & Reichardt, 1976
 Monachister Mazur, 1991
 Myrmetes Marseul, 1862
 Nannolepidius Reichardt, 1932
 Neopachylopus Reichardt, 1926
 Notosaprinus Kryzhanovskij, 1972
 Orateon Lackner & Ratto, 2014
 Pachylopus Erichson, 1834
 Parahypocaccus Vienna, 1995
 Paramyrmetes Bruch, 1929
 Paraphilothis Vienna, 1994
 Paravolvulus Reichardt, 1932
 Philothis Reichardt, 1930
 Philoxenus Mazur, 1991
 Pholioxenus Reichardt, 1932
 Phoxonotus Marseul, 1862
 Pilisaprinus Kanaar, 1996
 Reichardtia Wenzel, 1944
 Reichardtiolus Kryzhanovskij, 1959
 Saprinillus Kryzhanovskij, 1974
 Saprinodes Lewis, 1891
 Saprinus Erichson, 1834
 Sarandibrinus Lackner & Gomy, 2014
 Satrapister Bickhardt, 1912
 Styphrus Motschulsky, 1845
 Terametopon Vienna, 1987
 Tomogenius Marseul, 1862
 Turanostyphrus Tishechkin, 2005
 Xenonychus Wollaston, 1864
 Xenophilothis Kryzhanovskij, 1987
 Xerosaprinus Wenzel in Arnett, 1962
 Zorius Reichardt, 1932

References

Further reading

External links

 

Histeridae